Bardesti may refer to:

 Bărdești, Mureș County, Romania; a village in the commune of Sântana de Mureş
 Bârdeşti, Alba County, Romania; a village in the commune of Lupșa